The age of consent is the age at which a person is considered to be legally competent to consent to sexual acts and is thus the minimum age of a person with whom another person is legally permitted to engage in sexual activity. The distinguishing aspect of the age of consent laws is that the person below the minimum age is regarded as the victim, and his or her sex partner is regarded as the offender, unless both are underage.

Maps

Definitions 

Restricted by age difference: younger partner is deemed able to consent to having sex with an older one as long as their age difference does not exceed a specified amount.
Restricted by authority: younger partner is deemed able to consent to having sex with an older one as long as the latter is not in a position of trust or authority, or is not recognised to be abusing the inexperience of the younger one.
Unrestricted: age from which one is deemed able to consent to having sex with anyone else or marriageable age if they must be married

Different jurisdictions express these definitions differently, like Argentina, may say the age of consent is 18, but an exception is made down to 13 years of age, if the older partner is not in a position of authority over the younger one. The data below reflects what each jurisdiction's legislation actually means, rather than what it states on the surface.

Tables

Australia

Mexico

United States

Rest of the world

See also 

Age of consent
Ages of consent in Africa
Ages of consent in Asia
Ages of consent in Europe
Ages of consent in North America
Ages of consent in the United States
Ages of consent in Oceania
Ages of consent in South America
Age of consent reform
Age of consent reform in Canada
Age of consent reform in the United Kingdom
Age of Consent Act, 1891
 French petition against age of consent laws
 Youth
 Youth suffrage
 Youth rights
 Legal age
 Legal drinking age
 Age of majority
 Age of reason (canon law)
 Age of accountability
 Mature minor doctrine
 Emancipation of minors
 Fitness to plead, law of England and Wales
 Minors and abortion
 Convention on the Rights of the Child
 Child sexual abuse
 Sex-positive movement
 Age disparity in sexual relationships
 Comprehensive sex education
 Adult film industry regulations
 Sodomy law
 The Maiden Tribute of Modern Babylon

References 

Sex laws
Sexuality
Minimum ages]